The 1995–96 AHL season was the 60th season of the American Hockey League. The AHL expands by two teams and realigns into two conferences, and four divisions. The Northern Conference includes the North and Atlantic Divisions. The Southern Conference include the South Division and the newly created Central Division.

The league introduces two new trophies for division champions of the regular season. The Frank Mathers Trophy is first awarded for the south division, and the Sam Pollock Trophy is first awarded for the atlantic Division. The John D. Chick Trophy becomes awarded to the central division.

The AHL revives awarding points for overtime losses, last awarded in the 1987–88 AHL season. Eighteen teams played 80 games each in the schedule. The Albany River Rats finished first overall in the regular season. The Rochester Americans won their sixth Calder Cup championship.

Team changes
 The Baltimore Bandits join the AHL as an expansion team, based in Baltimore, Maryland, playing in the South Division.
 The Carolina Monarchs join the AHL as an expansion team, based in Greensboro, North Carolina, playing in the South Division.
 The Cornwall Aces, Rochester Americans, and Syracuse Crunch switch from the South Division to the new Central Division.
 The Adirondack Red Wings and Albany River Rats switch from the North Division to the new Central Division.

Final standings
Note: GP = Games played; W = Wins; L = Losses; T = Ties; OTL = Overtime losses; GF = Goals for; GA = Goals against; Pts = Points;

Northern Conference

Southern Conference

Scoring leaders

Note: GP = Games played; G = Goals; A = Assists; Pts = Points; PIM = Penalty minutes

 complete list

Calder Cup playoffs

All Star Classic
The 9th AHL All-Star Game was played on January 16, 1996, at the Hersheypark Arena in Hershey, Pennsylvania. Team USA defeated Team Canada 6-5. In the inaugural AHL skills competition held the day before the All-Star Game, Team USA won 14-12 over Team Canada.

Trophy and award winners

Team Awards

Individual awards

Other awards

See also
 List of AHL seasons

References

 AHL official site
 AHL Hall of Fame
 HockeyDB

 
American Hockey League seasons
2
2